Gavin Buchanan Ewart FRSL (4 February 1916 – 23 October 1995) was a British poet who contributed to Geoffrey Grigson's New Verse at the age of seventeen.

Life
Ewart was born in London and educated at Wellington College, before entering Christ's College, Cambridge, where he received a B.A. in 1937 and an M.A. in 1942.

After active service as a Royal Artillery officer during World War II, he worked in publishing and with the British Council before becoming an advertising copywriter in 1952. He lived at Kenilworth Court in Putney, London, and a blue plaque at Kenilworth Court commemorates this.

Poetry
From the age of 17, when his poetry was first printed in Geoffrey Grigson's New Verse, Ewart acquired a reputation for wit and accomplishment through such works as "Phallus in Wonderland", and Poems and Songs, which appeared in 1939 and was his first collection.

The Second World War disrupted his development as a poet, however, and he published no further volumes until Londoners of 1964, although he did write the English lyrics for the "World Song" of the World Association of Girl Guides and Girl Scouts.

From 1964, he produced many collections, which included The Gavin Ewart Show (1971), No Fool like an Old Fool (1976), All My Little Ones (1978), The Ewart Quarto (1984), The Young Pobble's Guide to His Toes (1985), and  Penultimate Poems (1989). The Collected Ewart: 1933–1980 (1980) was supplemented in 1991 by Collected Poems: 1980–1990.

The intelligence and casually flamboyant virtuosity with which he framed his often humorous commentaries on human behaviour made his work invariably entertaining and interesting. The irreverent eroticism for which his poetry is noted resulted in W. H. Smith's banning of his The Pleasures of the Flesh (1966) from their shops.

As an editor, he produced numerous anthologies, including The Penguin Book of Light Verse (1980). He was the 1991 recipient of the Michael Braude Award for Light Verse.

Ewart's life and poetry are the subject of a book entitled Civil Humor: the Poetry of Gavin Ewart by Stephen W. Delchamps (Fairleigh Dickinson University Press, 2002).

Selected bibliography 
 1939: Poems and Songs
 1964: Londoners. Pleasure of the Flesh
 1971: The Gavin Ewart Show
 1976: No Fool like an Old Fool
 1978: All My Little Ones
 1980: The Collected Ewart: 1933–1980
 1984: The Ewart Quarto
 1985: The Gavin Ewart Show: Selected Poems 1939–1985
 1985: The Young Pobble's Guide to His Toes 1987: Late Pickings 1989: Penultimate Poems 1991: Collected Poems: 1980–1990 As editor 
 1980: The Penguin Book of Light VerseHonours
 Cholmondeley Award, 1971
 Fellow of the Royal Society of Literature, 1981

References

External links

 "Gavin Ewart" at the Poetry Archive.
 Obituary by Anthony Thwaite in The Independent, 24 October 1995
 Obituary (additional information) by David Gascoyne in The Independent'', 25 October 1995
 

1916 births
1995 deaths
20th-century English poets
Alumni of Christ's College, Cambridge
British Army personnel of World War II
People educated at Wellington College, Berkshire
People from Putney
Royal Artillery officers